Walter Carr (1 April 1925 – 30 May 1998) was a Scottish actor and comedian.

He played the servant, Jack, in the Edinburgh Gateway Company's Edinburgh International Festival production of Robert McLellan's historical comedy The Flouers o Edinburgh in August 1957, and was in the cast of its production of All for Mary by Kay Bannerman and Harold Brooke in February 1958.  He played one of the Vices in Tyrone Guthrie's Edinburgh Festival production of Ane Satyre of the Thrie Estaites at the Church of Scotland's Assemby Hall in August 1959. In 1963, he gave a memorable comedy performance as the imagined invalid in the Gateway's production of The Hypochondriack, Victor Carin's translation into Scots of Molière's Le malade imaginaire.

Possibly his best known role was as the mate Dougie in the TV series The Vital Spark (1965-67).

He played Shooey in Lex MacLean's TV series. Other television roles included Davy McNeil in The Dark Island (1962), James Pigg in Mr. John Jorrocks (1966), and Advocate Fife in Weir of Hermiston (1973).

He had a minor part as the school teacher in the cult film The Wicker Man (1973), and played a jeweller in the comedy The Girl in the Picture (1985).

Filmography
The Wicker Man (1973) – School Master
The Girl in the Picture (1985) – Jeweller (final film role)

References

External links
 

1925 births
People from Larkhall
1998 deaths
Sinden family
Scottish male film actors
Scottish male television actors
20th-century Scottish male actors
Scottish male comedians
20th-century British comedians